Michael Lewis Greenwell (born July 18, 1963) is a former left fielder in Major League Baseball (MLB) who played his entire MLB career with the Boston Red Sox (1985–1996). He played a few games for the Hanshin Tigers in Japan (1997), before retiring. Greenwell was nicknamed "The Gator". He batted left-handed and threw right-handed. He was fourth in Rookie of the Year voting in 1987. Greenwell was a leading contender for the American League MVP award in 1988, but lost to Jose Canseco, who had the first 40 home run, 40 stolen base season in baseball history. Greenwell hit .325 with 22 home runs and 119 RBIs in 1988, setting career highs in all three categories.

Early life 
Greenwell was born in Louisville, Kentucky. When he was five years old, his family relocated to Fort Myers, Florida; he would later attend North Fort Myers High School, where he played both baseball and football.

Baseball career

Major League Baseball
Greenwell was drafted in the third round of the 1982 Major League Baseball Draft by the Red Sox, and was signed on June 9, 1982. Throughout his Red Sox career, Greenwell suffered under the weight of lofty expectations for a Boston left fielder, as since 1940 the position had been occupied by Ted Williams, Carl Yastrzemski and Jim Rice — all MVP winners, regular triple crown candidates, and eventual members of the Baseball Hall of Fame. Although his play rarely reached the level of his predecessors, he provided a solid and reliable presence in the team's lineup for several seasons. Well respected, he also served as the team's player representative for a time. Greenwell was runner-up for the 1988 American League MVP Award to Jose Canseco of the Oakland Athletics; years later, Canseco's admission of steroid use led Greenwell to ask, "Where's my MVP?"

On September 14, 1988, Greenwell hit for the cycle, becoming the 17th player to do so in Red Sox franchise history. On September 2, 1996, the Red Sox beat the Seattle Mariners 9–8 in 10 innings at the Kingdome, with Greenwell driving in all nine runs for the Sox, a record for most runs driven in by one player accounting for all of that team's runs in a single game. He also holds the American League record for most game-winning RBIs in a single season, with 23 in 1988; the game-winning RBI has since been discontinued as an official statistic. Greenwell was inducted to the Boston Red Sox Hall of Fame in 2008.

Career MLB statistics

"The Gator"
Greenwell received his nickname during spring training in Winter Haven. He had captured an alligator, taped its mouth shut, and put it in Ellis Burks' locker.

Nippon Professional Baseball
Greenwell signed with the Hanshin Tigers of Nippon Professional Baseball in 1997. His career in the major leagues heightened expectations from Japanese fans, but he left the team during spring training and returned to the United States; he had suffered a herniated disc when diving for a ball. He did not return to Japan until late April. He played his first game on May 3, and hit an RBI triple in that game despite having missed spring training. However, Greenwell suddenly announced his retirement after appearing in just seven games; he had fractured his right foot with a foul tip, and the injury would have prevented him from playing for at least four weeks.

Coaching
In 2001, Greenwell was hired during the offseason as a player-coach for the Cincinnati Reds' Double-A affiliate in Chattanooga, Tennessee. Greenwell was also the interim hitting coach for the Reds in 2001, filling in when Ken Griffey Sr. was given a medical leave of absence.

Racing career

Upon his retirement from baseball, Greenwell began driving late model stock cars at New Smyrna Speedway, winning the 2000 Speedweeks track championship. In May 2006, he made his Craftsman Truck Series debut at Mansfield Motorsports Park for Green Light Racing, starting 20th and finishing 26th. In 2010, Greenwell gave up racing.

Motorsports career results
NASCAR
(key) (Bold – Pole position awarded by qualifying time. Italics – Pole position earned by points standings or practice time. * – Most laps led.)

Craftsman Truck Series

Personal life
Greenwell owns a  ranch in Alva, Florida, on which he grows fruits and vegetables. He owned an amusement park in Cape Coral, Florida, called "Mike Greenwell's Bat-A-Ball & Family Fun Park", which opened in February 1992. He recently sold the park, which is now known as Gator Mike's.

Greenwell's wife Tracy is a nurse, and they have two sons, both of whom Greenwell coached. Bo was drafted as an outfielder in the sixth round of the 2007 MLB Draft; he spent a total of eight years in the minor leagues, in the farm systems of the Cleveland Indians (2007–2013) and the Red Sox (2014). First baseman Garrett started at Santa Fe Community College in 2011 before transferring to Oral Roberts University in 2013. Greenwell is the uncle of Joey Terdoslavich, who played for the Atlanta Braves (2013–2015).

See also
 List of Major League Baseball players who spent their entire career with one franchise
 List of Major League Baseball players to hit for the cycle

References

Further reading

Mike Greenwell at Baseballbiography.com
Mike Greenwell profile at SawxHeads.com via Wayback Machine

External links

Mike Greenwell at SABR (Baseball BioProject)

Mike Greenwell's Bat-A-Ball & Family Fun Park

1963 births
American expatriate baseball players in Japan
American League All-Stars
Baseball players from Louisville, Kentucky
Boston Red Sox players
Cincinnati Reds coaches
Elmira Pioneers players
Hanshin Tigers players
Living people
Major League Baseball left fielders
NASCAR drivers
Pawtucket Red Sox players
Racing drivers from Kentucky
Sportspeople from Fort Myers, Florida
Winston-Salem Spirits players
Silver Slugger Award winners